Fernand "Fred" Bonsor was a rugby union international who represented England from 1886 to 1889, he also captained his country. At club level he played for Bradford FC, and Skipton RFC.

Early life
Fernand Bonsor was born in 1862 in France, the son of Robert and Louise Bonsor. His father was a dye manufacturer. Fernand, his elder brother Robert, younger brother Morris, and both parents, were born in France, though British subjects. The family moved to Shipley sometime after 1871 and Fernand soon became known as Fred. In his latter teens he studied for the Civil Service examination although his profession by his late twenties seemed to follow his father into industry, being a wholesale bottler and agent. During July–September 1885 he married Fannie Milnes of Halifax in Bradford district.

Rugby union career
Bonsor made his international début on Saturday 2 January 1886 at the Rectory Field, Blackheath in the England versus Wales match.
Of the six matches he played for his national side he was on the winning side on 3 occasions.
He played his last match for England on Saturday 16 February 1889 at Rectory Field, Blackheath in the England versus New Zealand Natives match.

Change of Code
When Bradford converted from the rugby union code to the rugby league code on Thursday 29 August 1895, Fred Bonsor would have been approximately 33 years of age. Consequently, he may have been both a rugby union and rugby league footballer for Bradford.

References

External links
Search for "Bonsor" at rugbyleagueproject.org
Biography of Arthur Budd with an England team photograph including Fred Bonsor
Photograph "Bradford's Yorkshire Rugby Union Cup winning side - Bradford's only Yorkshire Cup winning side of the Rugby Union era. - 01/01/1884" at rlhp.co.uk
Photograph "Fred Bonsor - Half back and captain of the Yorkshire Cup winning team, also captained the England Rugby Union team in 1889 - 01/01/1890" at rlhp.co.uk
Photograph "Bradford (F.C.) c.1888 - This team contained six England internationals. - 01/01/1888" at rlhp.co.uk
Search for "Fred Bonsor" at britishnewspaperarchive.co.uk

1862 births
1932 deaths
Bradford F.C. players
England international rugby union players
English rugby union players
Rugby union halfbacks
Skipton RFC players
Yorkshire County RFU players
Sportspeople from Shipley, West Yorkshire